Help! ... It's the Hair Bear Bunch! is an American animated television series, produced by Hanna-Barbera, which originally aired for one season on CBS from September 11, 1971, to January 8, 1972. Daws Butler, Paul Winchell and William Callaway voice the three bears that comprise the Hair Bear Bunch, while John Stephenson and Joe E. Ross voice Mr. Peevly and Botch, respectively, the two individuals who patrol the zoo in which the bears live. The series' producer was Charles A. Nichols, with William Hanna and Joseph Barbera directing, and Hoyt Curtin serving as the composer.

A 13-issue comic book series was created by Gold Key Comics and began distribution in November 1971. Many television critics compared the premise of the show to other Hanna-Barbera productions, such as Top Cat and Yogi Bear. While in syndication, the series aired on multiple television networks in the United States, including Boomerang, Cartoon Network, and the USA Network. In total, Help!... It's the Hair Bear Bunch! contained sixteen 30 minute-long episodes. It has also been released digitally to the Google Play Store and iTunes Store and physically on DVD as part of Warner Bros.' Archive Collection on a four-disc set.

Storyline
The series follows the Hair Bear Bunch, a group of three bear cousins who live at the local Wonderland Zoo run by zoo director Mr. Peevly and zookeeper Lionel Botch. They also serve as the "wacky heroes" of the show.  The three bears would occasionally escape their luxurious cage to ride on their "invisible motorcycle[s]"; however, they would always return to the cage before Mr. Peevly or Lionel Botch were able to catch them. Even Peevly and Botch are visited by their boss the Zoo Superintendent. The bears had several motives for pranking and fooling Mr. Peevly and Mr. Botch, including trying to "improve their living conditions" and wanting to "embark on get-rich-quick schemes". The bears also wore clothes; according to author Christopher P. Lehman, Hanna-Barbera "dress[ed] the bears in counterculture apparel" in order to stay on track with the "mainstream" fashion in the United States.Sometimes, the bears (usually Hair) would activate a hidden switch to reveal a cave with more luxurious surroundings (complete with modern furniture) instead of the more meager accommodations they were normally seen living in.

Characters
The series features the following five main characters throughout its run:

 Daws Butler as Hair Bear, the afro-wearing leader of the Hair Bear Bunch. While developing a voice for Hair Bear, Butler "approximated his voice" to that of Phil Silvers as Sergeant Bilko in CBS's The Phil Silvers Show (1955–1959).
 Paul Winchell as Bubi Bear, the "more level-headed confederate" to Hair Bear, though he sometimes speaks in unintelligible gibberish.
 Bill Callaway as Square Bear, the most idiotic and "dimwitted" of the three bears, though he is the one who usually conjures up the "invisible motorcycle[s]" they use to make their escapes. His personality has also been described as "dopey" and "laid-back".
 John Stephenson as Mr. Peevly, the irritable, frustrated and authoritarian zoo director at Wonderland Zoo whom the three bears constantly try to outsmart – often successfully.
 Joe E. Ross as Lionel Botch, a zookeeper who is the "harebrained assistant" to Mr. Peevly.  He is constantly completing work for Mr. Peevly, despite him putting Lionel "in dangerous situations for selfish reasons". He is also constantly rebuked by Peevly whenever he asks about his promotion to some unspecified title.

Production and promotion
Executively produced and directed by William Hanna and Joseph Barbera's Hanna-Barbera Productions, Charles A. Nichols served as the series' main producer. Additionally, Robert "Bob" Givens contributed as the layout artist for the storyboards. The show's official theme song was written by Hoyt Curtin, who also served as the series' music composer. Other than the main cast, frequent Hanna-Barbera voice actors Janet Waldo, Joan Gerber, Lennie Weinrib, Hal Smith and Vic Perrin played several minor characters for the show. A group of five writers wrote for Help!... It's the Hair Bear Bunch!, including Joel Kane, Heywood Kling, Howard Morgenstern, Joe Ruby, and Ken Spears. Despite Stephenson ultimately playing the role of Mr. Peevly, Barbera had intended for Joe Flynn to play the part since the character was based on Flynn's Captain Binghamton from McHale's Navy; however, when Flynn came into audition for the part, Barbera was unimpressed and cast Stephenson for the part instead. Barbera claimed "that Joe Flynn didn't sound enough like Joe Flynn."

Gold Key Comics adapted several Hanna-Barbera and "Saturday morning-based" productions (such as The Funky Phantom, The Harlem Globetrotters, and Lidsville) into comic books. The adaptation of Help!... It's the Hair Bear Bunch! was titled just The Hair Bear Bunch and began distribution in 1972. 13 different issues were made for the series overall.

Help!... It's the Hair Bear Bunch! contained a laugh track created by Hanna-Barbera.

Episodes

Reception

Broadcast history
Help! ... It's the Hair Bear Bunch! was broadcast on CBS between September 11, 1971 and January 8, 1972. The series was cancelled after the first season, consisting of sixteen episodes, was completed airing; according to Lehman, the series was unsuccessful because it did not appeal to a younger audience, citing its similarities to The Phil Silvers Show as an additional reason. It returned Sunday mornings at 9:30 AM on September 9, 1973 then was moved to Saturdays at 8 AM on February 2, 1974 after CBS revamped their Saturday line-up.

In syndication, the series was replayed on several television networks after its cancellation. USA Network ran the series beginning February 19, 1989, and until November 7, 1991. The United States' Cartoon Network began broadcasting it in 1994 and its sister channel Boomerang did so on several occasions in the early-to-late 2000s. A physical release on VHS first occurred in September 1988 and features three episodes from the series. Years later, as part of the Warner Bros. Television Distribution's Archive Collection, the complete Help! ... It's the Hair Bear Bunch series was made available on DVD as a four-disc set. It was also released digitally to the Google Play Store and iTunes Store libraries in its entirety.

Critical response
Help! ... It's the Hair Bear Bunch! was compared to several other Hanna-Barbera productions. David Mansour, author of From Abba to Zoom: A Pop Culture Encyclopedia of the Late 20th Century, compared the show's premise to the storyline of Hanna-Barbera's Top Cat and wrote, "but instead of a gang of hip cats residing in an alley, it starred a bunch of cool bears living at the zoo." Christopher P. Lehman, who wrote American Animated Cartoons of the Vietnam Era, also compared it to a previous television series, but instead to the live-action The Phil Silver Show. Author David Perlmutter considered the show to be a reworked version of Yogi Bear, which he deemed appropriate because "the youth of the late 1960s and early 1970s" had a "'hippie' mindset." He also noted that because the series "incorporated some of the 'flip, sophisticated' style of the early animal con-artist formula, the series maintained a distinct connection with the time and place in which it was produced."

Besides Wait Till Your Father Gets Home (1972–1974) and Hong Kong Phooey (1974), Nichola Dobson wrote in The A to Z of Animation and Cartoons that Help! ... It's the Hair Bear Bunch! was one of Hanna-Barbera's more successful shows. However, in The Encyclopedia of Guilty Pleasures: 1001 Things You Hate to Love, three different authors labeled the series as one of Hanna-Barbera's "lesser-known efforts" but ultimately called it a "guilty pleasure" and enjoyed that it had its own score. In a retrospective view of older cartoons, the staff at MeTV included the show on their list of "15 Forgotten Cartoons from the Early 1970s You Used to Love." Deirdre Sheppard from Common Sense Media rated it three out of five stars and noted that it has "no educational content"; however, she also said that "other than the mildest of mild violence, and the characters' tendency to poke fun at each other, the series is fun and inoffensive."

Other appearances
 The Hair Bear Bunch made special guest appearances at a celebrity roast honoring Fred Flintstone in the TV special Hanna-Barbera's All-Star Comedy Ice Revue (1977).
 Hair Bear made a cameo appearance as a animatronic in the Dexter's Laboratory episode "Chubby Cheese".
 The Hair Bear Bunch also made a brief appearance in the pilot of Welcome to Eltingville.
 Hair Bear made an appearance in the Harvey Birdman, Attorney at Law episode "Juror in Court". He was accused of property damage and attacking customers and co-workers at a fast food restaurant when Harvey Birdman thought that he was on trial for not wearing a hair net. Mentok the Mindtaker had to clear things up with Harvey Birdman about Hair Bear's case.
 The Hair Bear Bunch appear in Jellystone!

See also
 List of works produced by Hanna-Barbera Productions

References

Citations

Bibliography

 
 
 
 
 
 
 

 
 
 
 
 
 
 
 

CBS original programming
1970s American animated television series
1971 American television series debuts
1972 American television series endings
American children's animated comedy television series
English-language television shows
Television series by Hanna-Barbera
Animated television series about bears
Television series about cousins
Television series created by Joe Ruby
Television series created by Ken Spears